The Ministry of Environment is a ministry of the Government of Maharashtra. The ministry is responsible for promoting environmental  issues in Maharashtra.

The Ministry is headed by a cabinet level minister. Eknath Shinde is current Chief Minister of Maharashtra and Minister of Environment and Climate Change.

Head office

List of Cabinet Ministers

List of Ministers of State

History
Ministry of Environment was renamed as Ministry of Environment and Climate Change in 2020.

Maharashtra Pollution Control Board
Maharashtra Pollution Control Board (MPCB) is execution wing of the ministry.
MPCB is responsible for implementation of -
Water (Prevention and Control of Pollution) Act, 1974
Air (Prevention and Control of Pollution) Act, 1981
Water (Cess) Act, 1977
Few provisions under Environmental (Protection) Act, 1986
Biomedical Waste (M&H) Rules, 1998,
Hazardous Waste (M&H) Rules, 2000,
Municipal Solid Waste Rules, 2000 etc.
MPCB is an ISO 9000 and ISO 27001 certified organization.

Composition of the MPCB
As per provisions of section 4 of the Water (P&CP) Act, 1974 and section 5 of Air (P&CP) Act, 1981), board consists of -
Chairman,
Member Secretary
Official and Non-Official Members

References

External links 
 

Government ministries of Maharashtra
Maharashtra